The 1991 Washington State Cougars football team was an American football team that represented Washington State University in the Pacific-10 Conference (Pac-10) during the 1991 NCAA Division I-A football season. In their third season under head coach Mike Price, the Cougars compiled a 4–7 record (3–5 in Pac-10, tied for sixth), and were outscored by their opponents 340 to 280.

The team's statistical leaders included Drew Bledsoe with 2,741 passing yards, Shaumbe Wright-Fair with 843 rushing yards, and Phillip Bobo with 759 receiving yards.

Schedule

Roster

NFL Draft
Four Cougars were selected in the 1992 NFL Draft.

References

Washington State
Washington State Cougars football seasons
Washington State Cougars football